Panama City is a city in and the county seat of Bay County, Florida, United States. Located along U.S. Highway 98 (US 98), it is the largest city between Tallahassee and Pensacola. It is also the most populated city of the Panama City–Lynn Haven, Florida metropolitan statistical area. Panama City was severely damaged when Hurricane Michael made landfall as a Category 5 hurricane on October 10, 2018. As of the 2020 census, the population was 35,392, down from the figure of 36,484 at the 2010 census.

When Panama City was incorporated in 1909, its original city limits were 15th Street (Hwy 98) on the north, Balboa Avenue on the west and Bay Avenue on the east.

Name
The development in this once unincorporated part of Northwest Florida had previous names such as Floriopolis, Park Resort, and Harrison. In 1906, the development was named Panama City and it was first incorporated as Panama City in 1909. When Panama City was incorporated, its original city limits were 15th Street (Hwy 98) on the north, Balboa Avenue on the west and Bay Avenue on the east. According to the Panama City Public Library's A History of Panama City, George Mortimer West hoped to spur real estate development in Bay County during a period of intense popular interest in the construction of the Panama Canal by changing the town's name from Harrison to Panama City, because a straight line between Chicago and the Central American country Panama's national capital intersected the Florida town. Additionally, since required meanders around land formations in a seaborne route to the canal added distance when starting at other ports, Panama City was the closest developed port in the US mainland to the Caribbean entrance of the Panama Canal.

Demographics

As of the census of 2010, there were 36,484 people, 14,792 households, and 8,613 families residing in the city. As of the census of 2010, the racial makeup of the city is 71.6% White, 22.0% African American, 1.6% Asian, 0.5% Native American, 0.1% Pacific Islander, 2.9% from two or more races, and 5.1% Hispanic or Latino of any race.

There were 14,792 households, out of which 23.6% had children under the age of 18 living with them, 36.3% were headed by married couples living together, 6.8% had a female householder with no husband present, and 41.8% were non-families. 34.1% of all households were made up of individuals, and 13.0% were someone living alone who was 65 years of age or older. The average household size was 2.28, and the average family size was 2.91.

In the city, the population was 20.7% under the age of 18, 10.2% from 18 to 24, 25.9% from 25 to 44, 26.9% from 45 to 64, and 16.3% who were 65 years of age or older. The median age was 39.7 years. For every 100 females, there were 96.3 males. For every 100 females age 18 and over, there were 95.2 males.

Geography

Panama City is located at  (30.174451, –85.664480) within the Florida Panhandle and along the Emerald Coast.

Climate

Panama City has a humid subtropical climate, with short, mild winters and long, hot and humid summers. In January, the average low is 42.6 °F (5.9 °C), and in July the average high is 91.1 °F (32.8 °C).

Due to its location on the Gulf Coast, the city is susceptible to tropical cyclones. In 2018, Panama City was directly hit by Hurricane Michael, which caused catastrophic damage to the city and surrounding communities, with winds of 160 mph (260 km/h) at landfall. The city previously suffered significant indirect impacts from Hurricane Ivan (2004) and Hurricane Opal (1995). The city was also heavily damaged by an EF2 tornado on March 18, 2022.

Time zone
Panama City is part of the Central Time Zone, unlike the city of Tallahassee to its east.

Economy

Personal income
As of the 2000 census, the city's median household income was $31,572, and the median income for a family was $40,890. Males had a median income of $30,401 versus $21,431 for females. The city's per capita income was $17,830. About 12.1% of families and 17.2% of the population were below the poverty line, including 24.5% of those under age 18 and 14.9% of those age 65 or over.

Industry

Two military bases make the federal government the largest employer. Other major industrial employers in the Bay County area include Eastern Shipbuilding Group, Gulf Power, Trane, L-3 Communications, ARINC, and JENSEN-GROUP.

Real estate
In 2006, Panama City was named the best place to invest in real estate in the US by CNN's Business 2.0 magazine.

Military
Tyndall Air Force Base is east of the city. The HHT 1-153 CAV is stationed there. It is part of Florida Army National Guard's 53rd Infantry Brigade. The city is also home to the U.S. Navy's Naval Support Activity Panama City which is home to various research and training projects. The city is also approximately 100 miles south of Fort Rucker, Alabama, home to the US Army's Aviation Center of Excellence.

Retail 
The city's main retail center was the Panama City Mall until it was permanently closed after Hurricane Michael. In August 2020, Panama City Mall released the plans to the mall. The plans for the mall includes a hotel, shops, and restaurants. Another local retail center is the Bay City Pointe, on FL 368 (locally known as 23rd St.). Pier Park, on the beach across the Hathaway Bridge spanning St. Andrews Bay, is a third local retail center. Others retail areas in the Panama City Metro are the 15th Street Shopping Strip (A area between Harrison Ave/US Highway 231 and Beck Ave/US Bus 98/State Road 390), 23rd Street Shopping Strip, Downtown Panama City, Historic St. Andrews, and Millville Historic District.

Hospitals 
The city has two hospitals, Ascension Sacred Heart Bay (known as Bay Medical Sacred Heart until Hurricane Michael destroyed a large portion of it) and HCA Florida Gulf Coast Medical Center.

Transportation

Major highways

Roads

The two main east–west thoroughfares in Panama City proper are 23rd Street and US 98. SR 368 runs east–west across the northern part of the city as a bypass. US 98 runs east–west through the city itself, leading southeast  to Mexico Beach and west  to Panama City Beach.

The two main north–south thoroughfares in the city are Martin Luther King Boulevard, otherwise known as SR 77 and US 231. SR 77 leads north  to the Panama City suburb of Lynn Haven. US 231 begins its national journey northward in the city, leading northeast  to Dothan, Alabama.

Other more local highways run through the city, including many county roads.

Bridges
Because of the city's position on St. Andrews Bay, bridges are very important to the area, and most directions into or out of the city require the use of one of three large bridges to cross parts of the bay. These are the Bailey Bridge to the north on Hwy 77, the Dupont Bridge to the south on Hwy 98 and the Hathaway Bridge to the west on Hwy 98. The largest of these is the Hathaway Bridge, which is the only direct connection between Panama City and Panama City Beach.

Rail
The Bay Line Railroad has an  rail line running north to Dothan, Alabama, to a connection with CSX Transportation and Norfolk Southern. Until some point between 1955 and 1956 the Atlanta and St. Andrews Bay Railroad ran passenger trains from Panama City to Dothan, Alabama. Additionally, the A&StA operated sleeping car service to Atlanta from Panama City.

Bus transportation

Local transit is handled by the Baytown Trolley services. Service generally runs Monday–Saturday from 6 AM to 7 PM.

Air transportation
The city was served by the Panama City-Bay County International Airport (PFN) until May 22, 2010. It was replaced by the Northwest Florida Beaches International Airport (ECP) with Southwest Airlines, Delta Air Lines, and United Airlines. In June 2018, ECP also added American Airlines.

Port
The Port of Panama City is on St. Andrews Bay.

Notable people

 Mike Campbell, lead guitarist for Tom Petty and the Heartbreakers
 Jaye Chapman, pitcher with the Chicago Cubs
 Donnie Craft, player of gridiron football
 Clint Daniels, country music artist
 Codi Galloway, member of the Idaho House of Representatives
 Clarence Earl Gideon, the plaintiff in Gideon v. Wainwright
 David Herndon, pitcher with the New York Yankees
 Robert Lee McKenzie, entrepreneur, real estate developer, first mayor of Panama City, and an important figure in the early history of Bob Jones University
 Thurop Van Orman, took inspiration from the city when living here as a kid to make The Marvelous Misadventures of Flapjack
 Dan Peek, member of the soft rock band America
 Blake Percival, Whistleblower
 Blood Raw, rapper with the group U.S.D.A and Young Jeezy
 Kenny Saief, player for the United States men's national soccer team
 Anwar Stewart, defensive lineman, Montreal Alouettes of the Canadian Football League
 Ray Wilson, defensive back in the National Football League for the New Orleans Saints and Green Bay Packers
 Stacy Wilson, professional hockey player and coach
 William Witherspoon, 1998 graduate of Rutherford High School, linebacker in the National Football League
 Janarius Robinson, 2016 graduate of Bay High School, defensive end in the National Football League for the Philadelphia Eagles former defensive end for the Minnesota Vikings, former defensive linemen for Florida State Seminoles

Media 

 The News Herald, newspaper
 WFSG, PBS affiliate on channel 56 (satellite of WFSU-TV, Tallahassee)
 WJHG, NBC affiliate on channel 7 (The CW & My Network TV digital)
 WMBB, ABC affiliate on channel 13
 WECP-LD, CBS affiliate on channel 18
 WPGX, Fox affiliate on channel 28
 Panama City Beach TV – Public-access television cable TV
 WGSX, 104.3 ESPN Northwest Florida, 
Sports Talk
 WASJ, Bob FM 105.1, 1980s/1990s/2000s
 WBPC, Beach 95.1, Oldies
 WFLF-FM, Fox News Radio
 WFSW, public radio
 WFSY, adult contemporary
 WILN, Island 106, Contemporary hit radio
 WKGC-FM, public radio
 WKNK, Kick'n Country, country
 WPAP, country
 WPFM, Hot 107.9, Contemporary hit radio
 WRBA, Classic Rock 95.9, Classic Rock
 WYOO, Talk Radio 101, Talk Radio
 WYYX, 97X, "Panama City's Rock Station"
 WAYP-FM, 88.3 WAY-FM Christian Hit Radio

Education
Panama City's public schools are operated by Bay District Schools. A system of charter schools, University Academy and Bay Haven Schools also services the Panama City area. Private schools in the city include, Holy Nativity Episcopal School, St. John Catholic School, Jacob Austin Prep. Academy, Covenant Christian School. Gulf Coast State College, formerly Gulf Coast Community College, is now a 4-year state college. Florida State University Panama City Campus and a satellite campus of Troy University are located in the city. Embry Riddle Aeronautical University has a satellite campus on Tyndall Air Force Base. Tom P. Haney Technical College is a local alternative to traditional college, offering a variety of vocational training programs. The school operates under the auspices of Bay District Schools. Public high schools in the Panama City metro-area include Rutherford High School,  Bay High School, Mosley High School, Arnold High School, Bozeman Learning Center, and Rosenwald High School.

Twinned City 
Panama City, Florida is twinned with one city:
  Mérida, Yucatán (November 13, 2003)

See also 

Port of St. Andrews

References

External links

 Panama City official website
 Destination Panama City
 Panama City, Florida's history with tropical systems from hurricanecity.com
 Historic newspapers for Panama City in the Florida Digital Newspaper Library including the Panama City Pilot
 

 

 
1909 establishments in Florida
Cities in Bay County, Florida
Cities in Florida
County seats in Florida
Populated places established in 1909
Populated places on the Intracoastal Waterway in Florida
Port cities and towns of the Florida Gulf coast